Satellite Award for Best Actor – Miniseries or Television Film is one of the categories of the annual Satellite Awards in film and television.

Winners and nominees

1990s

2000s

2010s

2020s

References

External links
 Official website

Actor Miniseries or Television Film
Television awards for Best Actor